Rhapsody in Bloom is a 1998 American television film, starring Penelope Ann Miller, Ron Silver, Craig Sheffer and Caroline Goodall. It was directed by Craig Saavedra.

Plot
Humor and self-awareness emerge in the Lilah Bloom's life as she ventures out to start a new life with a charming musician.

Cast
 Penelope Ann Miller as Lilah Bloom
 Ron Silver as Mitch Bloom
 Craig Sheffer as Jack Safrenek
 Caroline Goodall as Debra Loomis
 Scott Patterson as Phil

References

External links
 
 
 Rhapsody in Bloom at TCM
 Rhapsody in Bloom at Movie Web

1998 films
American television films
Films scored by David Michael Frank
1990s English-language films